Frank Roland "Rolle" Stoltz (1 August 1931 – 19 February 2001) was a Swedish ice hockey defenceman. He competed in the 1960, 1964 and 1968 Olympics and finished in fifth, second and fourth place, respectively. At the world championships he won two gold, two silver and two bronze medals between 1957 and 1967, and was named the best defenseman in 1963. Stoltz also won European titles in 1957 and 1962, and was selected to the Swedish all-star team in 1959, 1960, 1963, 1964 and 1966. In 1999 he was inducted into the IIHF Hall of Fame.

Stoltz was a mechanic with Atlas Copco, a Swedish mining machinery company. After retiring from competitions he worked as an ice hockey commentator on the Swedish national television.

References

External links

 

1931 births
2001 deaths
Djurgårdens IF Hockey players
Ice hockey players at the 1960 Winter Olympics
Ice hockey players at the 1964 Winter Olympics
Ice hockey players at the 1968 Winter Olympics
IIHF Hall of Fame inductees
Medalists at the 1964 Winter Olympics
Olympic ice hockey players of Sweden
Olympic medalists in ice hockey
Olympic silver medalists for Sweden
Ice hockey people from Stockholm
Swedish ice hockey defencemen